The Progressive Party or Progress Party was the first political party (in the modern sense) in Thailand. It was formed by royalists and was active from 1945 to 1946 before it merged into the Democrat Party.

History 
The Progressive Party was founded in 1945 by Kukrit Pramoj along with Suwitt Pansed, Sor Sethabud, Boontheng Thongsawat. The founders were opposed to the Khana Ratsadon ("People's Party") that had ruled the country since the Siamese revolution of 1932. Many royalist intellectuals, former political prisoners and veterans of the 1933 Boworadet rebellion joined the party. In 1946, the Progressive Party merged into the Democrat Party.

References

See also 
 List of political parties in Thailand

Defunct political parties in Thailand
Political parties established in 1945
Political parties disestablished in 1946
Monarchist parties
1945 establishments in Thailand
1946 disestablishments in Thailand